Muhammad Hassan (1880 - 1 June 1961) was a Pakistani Islamic scholar and founder of Jamia Ashrafia. He was educated at Darul Uloom Deoband. He was a student of Ashraf Ali Thanwi and Anwar Shah Kashmiri.

Life

He is the father of Fazl Rahim Ashrafi.

Hassan was born in 1880 in the town of Milpur on the outskirts of Hasan Abdal, to Maulana Allah Dad, a pious family of the Utmanzai tribe of Pathans. His father was a religious scholar. He received his early education in his hometown. After receiving further religious education from Muhammad Masoom, Abdul Jabbar Ghaznavi, Noor Muhammad and  Ghulam Mustafa Qasmi and other scholars, he went to Ashraf Ali Thanwi for self-purification and training. Hassan received his certificate of Tajwid and Art of Recitation from Karim Bakhsh and graduated from Darul Uloom Deoband by renewing the Hadith study from Anwar Shah Kashmiri.

Hassan supported the establishment of Pakistan. He had a corrective relationship with Ashraf Ali Thanwi, a and spiritual figure. In 1947, he established a religious institution in Lahore called Jamia Ashrafia under the name of Ashraf Ali Thanwi.

Death and legacy

Hassan died on 1 June 1961 in Karachi after a long illness. Funeral prayers were offered by Maulana Shah Abdul Ghani and he was buried in the Society Cemetery in Karachi.

Apart from the scholars of their time, former Prime Minister of Pakistan, Chaudhry Muhammad Ali, Sardar Abdur Rabb Nishtar and other governors, ministers and officials took pride in attending the Hassan's meetings. Islamic historians Syed Sulaiman Nadvi and Abdul Majid Daryabadi were also associated with the footsteps of Muhammad Hassan.

References 

1880 births
1961 deaths
Darul Uloom Deoband alumni
Deobandis
Pakistani Sunni Muslim scholars of Islam
Pakistan Movement activists
People from Lahore
People from Karachi
Academic staff of Jamia Ashrafia